JISD can refer to:
Japanische Internationale Schule in Düsseldorf
School districts in Texas abbreviated "JISD": List of school districts in Texas#J